Markus Hiden (February 4, 1978 in Voitsberg) is an Austrian retired professional footballer and manager.

Career
The West Steirer began with the football game at home SV Ligist. About the ASK Voitsberg and DSV Leoben, he found the way to Sturm Graz, 1998, he was there Austrian masters, and Austrian Bundesliga. About SV Ried went his way in 2001 at Rapid Wien, where in 2005 he was again champion. The summer transfer period 2006 Hiden moved to Cyprus and AEL Limassol, the end of January 2007, he signed a contract with Grazer AK.

National team
Markus Hiden had completed 5 matches with the Austria national football team in 2001 and 2002.

Coaching career
In the spring of 2010 he took over the role of player-coach at the Styrian lower division club FC Lankowitz, where he was released in summer 2010 after six months.

In December 2011 he took over as head coach at ASK Köflach. However, he was replaced in May 2013. In September 2013, he was appointed head coach of SK Sturm Graz' women's team. He left the position in the summer 2017.

National team statistics

Honours
 Austrian Bundesliga: 1999 (SK Sturm Graz); 2005 (Rapid Wien)

References

External links
 
 
 Markus Hiden at playerhistory.com

1978 births
Living people
Austrian footballers
Austria international footballers
Austrian expatriate footballers
Association football midfielders
Austrian Football Bundesliga players
Cypriot First Division players
Grazer AK players
SK Rapid Wien players
SV Ried players
SK Sturm Graz players
AEL Limassol players
DSV Leoben players
Expatriate footballers in Cyprus
Austrian expatriate sportspeople in Cyprus
Austrian football managers
People from Voitsberg
Footballers from Styria